Louis Senior (born 30 May 2000) is an  international rugby league footballer who plays as a er for Hull Kingston Rovers in the Betfred Super League.

He has previously played for the Huddersfield Giants in the Super League, and spent time on loan from Huddersfield at Hull KR in the top flight as well as Oldham in the Betfred Championship.

Background
Senior was born in Huddersfield, West Yorkshire, England.

Along with his twin brother Innes, Louis is a product of the Giants' academy system and both made their first team debuts over Easter 2018.

Career
In 2018 he made his Super League début for Huddersfield against Leeds.

Oldham (loan)
On 27 May 2021, it was reported that he had signed for Oldham in the RFL Championship on loan.

Hull KR (loan)
On 7 July 2022, it was reported that he had signed for Hull KR in the Super League on loan for the remainder of the 2022 season, with a view to it becoming a permanent move for the 2023 season.

International career
Senior scored two tries on debut for Ireland in their 48-2 victory over Jamaica in their opening fixture of the 2021 Rugby League World Cup.
In Ireland's final group stage match against New Zealand, Senior scored two tries in their 48-10 loss.

References

External links
Huddersfield Giants profile
SL profile
Ireland profile

2000 births
Living people
English rugby league players
Huddersfield Giants players
Hull Kingston Rovers players
Ireland national rugby league team players
Oldham R.L.F.C. players
Rugby league wingers
Rugby league players from Huddersfield